Jennifer Joan Taylor (born June 15, 1956) is a French-American actress in film and television. She is best known for playing Police Detective Chris Egan in the American daytime television soap opera, The Edge of Night. She is sometimes credited as Jennifer Taylor.

Early life 
Taylor was born in Paris, France, but was raised in Rice Lake, Wisconsin. She graduated from Viterbo University in 1978 with a theater arts degree.

Acting career 
In 1979, Taylor began acting at the Guthrie Theatre in Minneapolis, MN. In 1983, Taylor began her television career by appearing in a Hellman's mayonnaise television commercial. In the spring of that year, she was cast as Police Detective Chris Egan in the American daytime television soap opera, The Edge of Night. Her first appearance on the soap was on May 25, 1983, and she played that role until the soap's final episode on December 28, 1984. In the fall of 1983, she played the part of a soap opera actress in an ABC Afterschool Special episode.

Taylor's first film role was in Fright Night Part 2 (1988), and she starred as Karen Webb in the American thriller film, The Crude Oasis (1995). She has had parts in a number of other films, including Casualties (1997), White Chicks, Incorporated (1998), The Weather Man (2005) and Derailed (2005).

From 2005 to 2006, Taylor played Becky in Prison Break, and in 2008 she appeared in the film, The Lucky Ones. More recently, she has been seen in numerous episodes of Empire (2015–17) and Chicago Fire (2014–2020).

Personal life 
Taylor has been married to Garry Henderson since 1979 and they have two children

Partial filmography

References

External links 
 
 

1956 births
Living people
American film actresses
American soap opera actresses
American television actresses
French emigrants to the United States
21st-century American women